Avani Kiana Gregg (born November 23, 2002) is an American social media personality and make-up artist. She first developed a following on TikTok. Gregg plays Gemma in the web series Chicken Girls. She received the Shorty Award for TikToker of the Year in 2019, and was on the Forbes 30 Under 30 in 2020 in the social media category.

Early life 
Avani was born in Brownsburg, Indiana, on November 23, 2002. She is of Indian, Mongolian and African-American descent. Avani has two sisters, Shanti Gregg and Priya Gregg. Her older sister, Shanti, is also a social media influencer. As a child, Avani was a competitive gymnast until suffering a stress fracture in her back.

Career 
Avani posts content related to beauty and makeup. In 2019, Gregg's first viral video on TikTok of her transformation into a Harley Quinn-style clown led viewers to nickname her the "Clown Girl". In December 2019, she joined the LA-based collective The Hype House along with her best friend Charli D'Amelio. Gregg plays the character Gemma in the web series Chicken Girls. In September 2020, she announced an upcoming memoir published by Gallery Books. In November 2020, she began hosting a Facebook Watch talk show Here For It in which she helped fans with Gen-Z issues.

Personal life 
In March 2020, Gregg confirmed she was in a relationship with social media personality Anthony Reeves. They met three years previously through Musical.ly (currently TikTok).

Awards and nominations

See also 
 List of most-followed TikTok accounts

References

External links 
 
 

2002 births
Living people
American TikTokers
American make-up artists
African-American women artists
21st-century American women artists
21st-century American actresses
Actresses from Indiana
Artists from Indiana
Shorty Award winners
American actresses of Indian descent
American women artists of Indian descent
American people of Mongolian descent
American children
21st-century African-American women
21st-century African-American artists